Shahr Meyan (also Romanized as Shahr Meyān and Shahr Mīān; also known as Shahr Mīān-e Bālā, Shahr Mīān-e Kohneh, Shahr Mīān-e Now, Shahr Mīān-e Soflá, Shahr Mīyān, and Shar Mīān-e ‘Olyā) is a village in Shahr Meyan Rural District, in the Central District of Eqlid County, Fars Province, Iran. As of the 2006 census, its population was 1,786, in 393 families.

References 

Populated places in Eqlid County